Giorgos Sidiropoulos (25 June 1949 – 31 December 2015) was a Greek professional footballer who played as a goalkeeper.

Club career
Sidiropoulos took his first steps of his football career at the team of his hometown, PO Elassona and in 1968 he joined AO Trikala, where he became more widely known playing in the first division. In 1970 he was transferred to Pierikos but a year later he returned to Trikala. On 12 March 1972, he became the first Greek goalkeeper to score with a penalty in the 2–1 home win against Panathinaikos, while he also scored from the spot in the following season, scoring his team's only goal in a 1–2 away defeat from Panionios. He left from the club of Thessaly in the summer 1973, after they were relegated.

Afterwards, Sidiropoulos signed for AEK Athens, after the recommendation by their defender, Apostolos Toskas, who was also from Trikala. He established himself quickly in the squad. He reached the peak of his career in 1976, when he kept a clean sheet for 700 consecutive minutes, which made him the team's record holder and 7th overall in the history of the league. In 1976 he was seriously injured, when in the derby against Olympiacos, he clashed with Mike Galakos and ever since he lost his place as a starter. He was in the squad that reached the semi-finals of the UEFA Cup in the 1977, even though he didn't compete in any of the matches.

He left AEK halfway of the 1977–78 season and signed for AEL. In the summer of 1979 he signed with Atromitos until 1982, where he moved to Rhodes in order to play for Diagoras, where he ended his professional career. In the period 1985 he returned to PO Elassona as a player-coach for a year.

International career
Sidiropoulos played once for Greece on 1 April 1975 in a friendly away 2–1 win against Cyprus, under the instructions of Alketas Panagoulias

After football
He then retired from football Sidiropoulos moved to Germany, where he became a permanent resident working in catering businesses. He died on 31 December 2015 from cancer. His body was repatriated and buried in his native land at Elassona.

Honours

Atromitos
Beta Ethniki: 1979–80

References

Greek footballers
Association football goalkeepers
1949 births
2015 deaths
Deaths from cancer in Greece
Greece international footballers
Super League Greece players
Trikala F.C. players
Pierikos F.C. players
AEK Athens F.C. players
Athlitiki Enosi Larissa F.C. players
Atromitos F.C. players
Diagoras F.C. players
People from Elassona